An election to Waterford County Council took place on 20 June 1985 as part of that year's Irish local elections. 23 councillors were elected from four electoral divisions by PR-STV voting for a six-year term of office.

Results by party

Results by Electoral Area

Dungarvan

Kilmacthomas

Lismore

Tramore

External links
Irishelectionliterature

1985 Irish local elections
1985